Niccolò Jommelli (10 September 1714 – 25 August 1774) was an Italian composer of the Neapolitan School. Along with other composers mainly in the Holy Roman Empire and France, he was responsible for certain operatic reforms including reducing ornateness of style and the primacy of star singers somewhat.

Biographical information

Early life
He had one brother, Ignazio, who became a Dominican friar and was of some help to him in his elder years, and three sisters. His father was a prosperous linen merchant, who entrusted him for musical instruction to Canon Muzzillo, the director of the choir of Aversa Cathedral. 

When this proved successful, he was enrolled in 1725 at the Conservatorio di Santo Onofrio a Capuana in Naples, where he studied under Ignazio Prota alongside Tomaso Prota and Francesco Feo. Three years later he was transferred to the Conservatorio della Pietà dei Turchini, where he was trained under Niccolò Fago, with Don Giacomo Sarcuni and Andrea Basso, as second maestri (maestri di canto), or singing teachers. He was greatly influenced by Johann Adolf Hasse, who was in Naples during this period. After completing his studies he began work, and wrote two opere buffe, L'errore amoroso in early 1737 and Odoardo in late 1738. His first opera seria, Ricimero re di Goti, was such a success in Rome in 1740 that he immediately received a commission from Henry Benedict Stuart, the Cardinal-Duke of York.

When still studying at the conservatory, Jommelli was impressed with Hasse's use of obbligato recitative to increase the tension at certain dramatic moments in his operas. Speaking of obbligato recitative for Ricimero, Charles de Brosses says that Jommelli's use of obbligato recitative was better than anything he had heard in France.

First operas
His first opera, the comedy L'errore amoroso, was presented, with great success, under the protection of the Marquis del Vasto, Giovanni Battista d'Avalos, in the winter of 1737 at the Teatro Nuovo of Naples. It was followed the next year by a second comic opera, Odoardo, in the Teatro dei Fiorentini. His first serious opera Ricimero rè de' Goti, presented in the Roman Teatro Argentina in January 1740, brought him to the attention and then the protection of the Duke of York, Henry Benedict. The duke would later be raised to the rank of cardinal and procure Jommelli an appointment at the Vatican. During the 1740s, Jommelli wrote operas for many Italian cities: Bologna, Venice, Turin, Padua, Ferrara, Lucca, Parma, Naples and Rome.

Studies with Padre Martini
When in Bologna in 1741 for the production of his Ezio, Jommelli (in a situation blurred by anecdotes) met Padre Martini. Saverio Mattei said that Jommelli studied with Martini, and claimed to have learned with him "the art of escaping any anguish or aridity". Nonetheless, his constant travelling to produce his many operas seems to have prevented him from ever taking composition lessons on a regular basis. Moreover, his relationship with Martini was not without mutual criticism. The main result of his stay in Bologna and his association with Martini was to present to the Accademia Filarmonica of that city, as application for admission, his first known sacred composition, a five-voice fugue a cappella on the final words of the small doxology, "Sicut erat". Musicologist Karl Gustav Fellerer, who examined several such works, testifies that Jommelli's piece, though being just "a rigid school work", could well rank among the best admission pieces now stored in the Bolognese Accademia Filarmonica. During the early 1740s he wrote an increasing amount of religious music, mainly oratorios, and his first liturgical piece still extant, a very simple "Lætatus sum" in F major dated 1743, is part of the Santini collection in Münster.

Shortly after his time in Bologna, Jommelli moved to Venice and composed Merope, which was the forerunner for French operatic style later in the century. In the years immediately after this, he wrote operas for Venice, Turin, Bologna, Ferrara and Padua, and two popular oratorios, Isacco figura del Redentore and Betulia liberata.

Venice
Some time around 1745, Hasse recommended Jommelli for a position as the Director of Music at the Ospedale degli Incurabili in Venice, one of that city's colleges for female musicians. This full-time employment required him to compose sacred music (mostly settings of the Mass and the Divine Office), but the financial security it gave him also allowed him to compose several other dramatic works.

Hasse's recommended appointment of Jommelli as maestro di cappella to the Ospedale degl' Incurabili in Venice is not definitively documented. But in 1745, he did start writing religious works for the women's choir of the church of the Incurabili, San Salvatore, as part of his obligations as chapel master along with teaching the more advanced students of the institution. There are no manuscripts of Jommelli's music composed for the Incurabili, but there are many copies of different versions of several of his works that may, with some certainty, be attributed to his period as maestro there. Among the music Helmut Hochstein lists as being composed for Venice are to be found four oratorios: "Isacco figura del Redentore", "La Betulia liberata", "Joas" and "Juda proditor"; some numbers in a collection of solo motets called "Modulamina Sacra"; one Missa breve in F major with a Credo in D major, probably a second Mass in G major, one Te Deum and five psalms.

Although two of his earliest biographers, Mattei and Villarosa, give 1748 as the year when Jommelli gave up his employment in Venice, his last compositions for the Incurabili are from 1746. He must have left Venice at the very end of 1746 or at the beginning of the following year, because on 28 January 1747 Jommelli was staging at the Argentina theatre in Rome his first version of "Didone abbandonata", and in May at San Carlo in Naples a second version of "Eumene".

Rome
It was the need of an active chapel master for the basilica of St. Peter's in preparing for the Jubilee festival year that brought both Jommelli and Davide Perez to Rome in 1749, a year-long commemoration celebrated by the Roman Catholic Church every fifty years, so this was an important occasion for the Roman aristocracy to show off. Jommelli was summoned by the Cardinal Duke of York, Henry Benedict, to compose for him a setting of Metastasio's oratorio La passione di Gesù Cristo still played annually in Rome, and who presented him to Cardinal Alessandro Albani, an intimate of Pope Benedict XIV.

Stuttgart and last years
He subsequently visited Vienna before taking a post as Kapellmeister to Duke Karl Eugen of Württemberg in Stuttgart in 1753. This period saw some of his greatest successes, including the composition of what are regarded as some of his best works. Many were staged at the Duke's private theatres in the Palace of Ludwigsburg, outside Stuttgart. Mozart and his father Leopold passed through Ludwigsburg in 1763 on their "grand tour" and met the composer. Jommelli returned to Naples in 1768, by which time opera buffa was more popular than Jommelli's opera seria, and his last works were not so well received. He suffered a stroke in 1771 which partially paralyzed him, but continued to work until his death three years later, in Naples.

Works
Jommelli wrote cantatas, oratorios and other sacred works, but by far the most important part of his output were his operas, particularly his opere serie of which he composed around sixty, several with libretti by Metastasio. These tended to concentrate more on the story and drama of the opera than on flashy technical displays by the singers, as was the norm in Italian opera at that time. He wrote more ensemble numbers and choruses, and, influenced by French opera composers such as Jean-Philippe Rameau, introduced ballets into his work. He used the orchestra (particularly the wind instruments) in a much more prominent way to depict what was going on in the story, including passages for orchestra alone, rather than consigning it to merely support for the singers. From Hasse, he learned to write orchestrally accompanied recitatives rather than just "secco" recitatives for voice and continuo (mainly harpsichord). His reforms are sometimes regarded as equal in importance to Christoph Willibald Gluck's.

Chamber music
Sonata in C for Organ 4-Hands (c. 1750)
Trio Sonata in D for 2 Flutes and Cello (c. 1750)

Instrumental music
Ciaccona in Eb for Organ, Op. 5/13 (c. 1764)

Masses
Missa pro defunctis (Requiem) in Eb (1756)
Missa solemnis in D for Soprano, Alto, Tenor, Bass, Choir and Orchestra (1766)

Psalms
Beatus vir (c. 1750)
Laetatus sum (Psalm 122) in F (1743)
Miserere (Psalm 51) in G a 4 concertato (1749)
Miserere in G minor for 5 voices (SSATB), choir and continuo, HC1.23 (1750)
Miserere in D for 2 sopranos, alto and tenor (1751, for Rome)
Miserere in E minor for 8 voices (1753, for Stuttgart)
Pietà, pietà, Signore (Miserere) in G minor for 2 sopranos, strings and continuo (1774)

Oratorios
Isacco, figura del Redentore (1742)
Betulia liberata per 4 voci, coro e strumenti (Rome, 1743) – libretto by Metastasio
Gioas re di Giuda (Venice, 1745) – libretto by Metastasio
La Passione di Gesù Cristo per 4 voci (Venice, 1749) – libretto by Metastasio

Operas

L'errore amoroso (Naples, 1737) – libretto by Antonio Palomba
Odoardo (Naples, 1738)
Ricimero re de' Goti (Rome, 1740)
Astianatte (Rome, 1741) – libretto by Antonio Salvi
Ezio (Bologna, 1741) – libretto by Metastasio
Semiramide riconosciuta (Turin, 1741) – libretto by Metastasio
Merope (Venice, 1741) – libretto by Apostolo Zeno
Don Chichibio (Rome, 1742)
Eumene (Bologna, 1742) – libretto by Apostolo Zeno
Semiramide (Venice, 1742) – libretto by Francesco Silvani
Tito Manlio (Turin, 1743) – libretto by Gaetano Roccaforte
Demofoonte (Padua, 1743) – libretto by Metastasio
Alessandro nell'Indie (Ferrara, 1744) – libretto by Metastasio
Ciro riconosciuto (Ferrara, 1744; later in Bologna and Venice) – libretto by Metastasio
Sofonisba (Venice, 1746) – libretto by Antonio Zanetti e Girolamo Zanetti
Cajo Mario (Rome, 1746) – libretto by Gaetano Roccaforte
Antigono (Lucca, 1746) – libretto by Metastasio
Tito Manlio (Venice, 1746) – libretto by Jacopo Antonio Sanvitale
Didone abbandonata (Rome, 1747; later in Stuttgart) – libretto by Metastasio
L'amore in maschera (Naples, 1748) – libretto by Antonio Palomba
Achille in Sciro (Vienna, 1749; much later in Rome) – libretto by Metastasio
Artaserse (Rome, 1749) – libretto by Metastasio
Demetrio (Parma, 1749) – libretto by Metastasio
Intermezzo Don Trastullo (Rome, 1749)
Intermezzo L’uccelatrice e il Don Narciso (Venice, 1751) – libretto by Carlo Goldoni
Cesare in Egitto (Rome, 1751) – libretto by Giacomo Francesco Bussani
Ifigenia in Aulide (Rome, 1751) – libretto by Mattia Verazi
La villana nobile (Palermo, 1751) – libretto by Antonio Palomba
Ipermestra (Spoleto, 1751) – libretto by Metastasio
Talestri (Rome, 1751) – libretto by Gaetano Roccaforte
I rivali delusi (Rome, 1752)
Attilio Regolo (Rome, 1753)
Bajazette (Turin, 1753) – libretto by Agostino Piovene
Fetonte (Stuttgart, 1753) – libretto by Leopoldo de Villati
La clemenza di Tito (Stuttgart, 1753) – libretto by Metastasio
Il paratajo (Paris, 1753) – revision of L’uccelatrice e il Don Narciso
Don Falcone (Bologna, 1754)
Catone in Utica (Stuttgart, 1754) – libretto by Metastasio
Lucio Vero (Milan, 1754)
Il giardino incantato (Stuttgart, 1755)
Enea nel Lazio (Stuttgart, 1755) – libretto by Mattia Verazi
Penelope (Stuttgart, 1755) – libretto by Mattia Verazi
Il Creso (Rome, 1757) – libretto by Giovacchino Pizzi
Temistocle (Naples, 1757) – libretto by Metastasio
Tito Manlio (Stuttgart, 1758)
Ezio (Stuttgart, 1758)
L'asilo d'amore (Stuttgart, 1758)
Endimione (Stuttgart, 1759)
Nitteti (Stuttgart, 1759) – libretto by Metastasio
Alessandro nell'Indie (Stuttgart, 1760)
Cajo Fabrizio (Mannheim, 1760) – libretto by Mattia Verazi
L'Olimpiade (Stuttgart, 1761) – libretto by Metastasio
L'isola disabitata (Ludwigsburg, 1761) – libretto by Metastasio
Semiramide riconosciuta (Stuttgart, 1762)
Il trionfo d'amore (Ludwigsburg, 1763) – libretto by Giampiero Tagliazucchi
Demofoonte (Stuttgart, 1764)
Il re pastore (Ludwigsburg, 1764) – libretto by Metastasio
La pastorella illustre (Stuttgart, 1764) – libretto by Giampiero Tagliazucchi
Temistocle (Ludwigsburg, 1765)
Imeneo in Atene (Ludwigsburg, 1765)
Il matrimonio per concorso (Ludwigsburg, 1766) – libretto by Gaetano Martinelli
La critica (Ludwigsburg, 1766)
Il Vologeso (Ludwigsburg, 1766) – libretto by Mattia Verazi
Il matrimonio per concorso (Ludwigsburg, 1766)
Il cacciatore deluso (Tübingen, 1767) – libretto by Gaetano Martinelli
Fetonte (Ludwigsburg, 1768)
L'unione coronata (Solitude, 1768)
La schiava liberata (Ludwigsburg, 1768) – libretto by Gaetano Martinelli
Armida abbandonata (Naples, 1770) – libretto by Francesco Saverio de' Rogati
Demofoonte (Naples, 1770)
Ifigenia in Tauride (Naples, 1771) – libretto by Mattia Verazi
L'amante cacciatore (Rome, 1771)
Le avventure di Cleomede (1771) – libretto by Gaetano Martinelli
Cerere placata (Naples, 1772)
Il trionfo di Clelia (Naples, 1774) – libretto by Metastasio

Recordings
One concerto in Neapolitan Flute Concertos, Auser Musici, Carlo Ipata (2010), Hyperion CDA 67784
Six trio sonatas, played by the Accademia Farnese (Oct. 20, 1997), Mondo Musica label
Armida abbandonata, conducted by Rousset (Maison de la Radio, Paris, July 24 to Aug. 2, 1994), FNAC label
Didone abbandonata, conducted by Bernius (1994), Orfeo label
Il Vologeso, conducted by Bernius (1997), Orfeo label
L'uccelatrice e il Don Narciso, conducted by Fracassi (live in Piacenza, 2000), Bongiovanni label
L'uccelatrice e il Don Narciso, conducted by Moretto (live in Milan, 2003), Dynamic label
Requiem, Coro e Orchestra Ghislieri conducted by Giulio Prandi (studio recording, 2019), Arcana Label
Il Vologeso, The Mozartists, conducted by Ian Page (2021), Signum Records

References

Citations

Sources 

 Maurício Dottori. The Church Music of Davide Perez and Niccolò Jommelli. Curitiba: DeArtes-UFPR, 2008. (via Google Books)

External links
Don Trastullo

Istituto Internazionale per lo studio del '700 musicale napoletano

1714 births
1774 deaths
18th-century Italian male musicians
18th-century Italian composers
Italian Classical-period composers
Italian male classical composers
Italian opera composers
Male opera composers
Neapolitan school composers
People from Aversa